Several different far-left-oriented organizations in Peru refer to themselves as communist (comunista) parties, movements, organizations, groups, etc. Some are still active, under their original or other appellation, some have merged or split, and some have ceased operating.

Brief history

The oldest communist party in Peru is the Peruvian Communist Party (Partido Comunista Peruano), founded in 1928 by José Carlos Mariátegui, under the name Socialist Party of Peru (Partido Socialista del Perú). In 1930, the name was changed to Peruvian Communist Party. Jorge Del Prado was the party's General Secretary between 1966 and 1991.  Currently, the General Secretary is Roberto de la Cruz.  The main political base of PCP-Unidad is currently located at Plaza Ramón Castilla, Lima and is led by Renán Raffo Muñoz. PCP publishes Unidad ("Unity") and Nuestra Bandera ("Our Banner").

Another party that also considers itself the Communist Party of Peru is the Partido Comunista del Perú – Patria Roja, founded in 1970, and now, as of 2006, headed by Alberto Moreno. It descends from the mainstream faction of PCP-Bandera Roja, which, in turn, originated as a Maoist faction within the Partido Comunista Peruano.

Both PCP-Bandera Roja and PCP-Unidad are named after their traditional press organs. The name "PCP-Unidad" is an informal designation; the official name of the PCP-Unidad is simply "Partido Comunista Peruano". There was a faction called PCP-Mayoría around 1980: its members considered that PCP-Unidad had taken a Eurocommunist turn, while they themselves preferred a more hard-line Soviet stance.

There are a few more groups that also consider themselves the Communist Party of Peru. The best known is the group generally referred to as the "Shining Path" (a name which the group itself does not use). This armed group, regarded by the Peruvian state as a terrorist organization, is an offshoot of PCP-Bandera Roja, having splintered from it in the early 1970s. The "Shining Path" considers PCP-Patria Roja and PCP-Unidad to be revisionist; it has assassinated several of their militants and elected officials.

Political parties that have used the name

The Peruvian Communist Party was founded with the name of Peruvian Socialist Party (Partido Socialista del Perú) by José Carlos Mariátegui, and is considered the first communist party in Peru.

A number of political parties claim the name and legacy of the original party:
 Communist Party of Peru (Marxist–Leninist)
 Communist Party of Peru – Red Fatherland
 Communist Party – Red Star
 Communist Party of Peru – Shining Path
 Peruvian Communist Party – Red Flag
 Proletarian Party of Peru
 Revolutionary Communist Party – Red Trench
 Revolutionary Communist Party (Working Class)
 Revolutionary Socialist Party (Marxist–Leninist)
 Revolutionary Vanguard (Communist Proletarian)
 Revolutionary Workers' Party (Peru)
 Worker Peasant Student and Popular Front
 Workers' Revolutionary Party (Peru)

The United Left movement was a loose alliance of several of these leftist parties that gained a strong political presence in the 1980s.

See also 

 Anarchism in Peru
 Shining Path
 José Carlos Mariátegui

References 

 
Left-wing politics in Peru